The 2014 Zhonghong Jiangxi International Women's Tennis Open was a professional tennis tournament played on hard courts. It was the inaugural edition of the tournament which was part of the 2014 WTA 125K series and took place in Nanchang, China, on 21–28 July 2014.

Singles draw entrants

Seeds

 1 Rankings as of 14 July 2014

Other entrants 
The following players received wildcards into the singles main draw:
  Peng Shuai
  Wang Yafan
  Zheng Jie
  Zheng Wushuang

The following players received entry from the qualifying draw:
  Monique Adamczak
  Junri Namigata
  Tang Haochen
  Zhang Kailin

The following player received entry into the singles main draw as a lucky loser:
  Yang Zi

Withdrawals
Before the tournament
  Ayumi Morita [replaced by Yang Zi]

Doubles draw entrants

Seeds

Other entrants
The following pair received a wildcard into the doubles draw:
  Sun Xuliu /  Zheng Wushuang

Champions

Singles

  Peng Shuai def.  Liu Fangzhou 6–2, 3–6, 6–3

Doubles

  Chuang Chia-jung /  Junri Namigata def.  Chan Chin-wei /  Xu Yifan 7–6(7–4), 6–3

References

2014 WTA 125K series
2014
2014 in Chinese tennis